This page documents the tornadoes and tornado outbreaks of 1981, primarily in the United States. Most tornadoes form in the U.S., although some events may take place internationally. Tornado statistics for older years like this often appear significantly lower than modern years due to fewer reports or confirmed tornadoes.

Synopsis

Numbers for 1981 were below average, both in terms of number of tornadoes and number of fatalities.

Events

January
Only two tornadoes touched down in January, both were rated F0 and took place in California.

February
There were 25 tornadoes confirmed in the U.S. in February, injuring 82 people.

February 10–11
The first fatal tornadoes of the year occurred during a relatively small outbreak between February 10 and 11. Two F2 tornadoes, one in Walker County, Texas and the other in Hoke/Cumberland County, North Carolina, killed one person each.

March
There were 33 tornadoes confirmed in the U.S. in March.

March 30
One person was killed by an F2 tornado in Hertford County, North Carolina.

April
There were 84 tornadoes confirmed in the U.S. in April. Most of the year's fatalities took place during the month, with 13 people perishing.

April 4

A rare anticyclonic tornado struck West Bend, Wisconsin at F4 intensity, killing three people and injuring 53 others. It was part of a small outbreak that produced five tornadoes with 10 additional injuries also taking place.

April 19
Five people were killed in Bixby, Oklahoma by an F3 tornado.

May
There were 187 tornadoes in the US in May.

May 22–23

An outbreak of 43 tornadoes occurred in areas from Western Oklahoma to Central Iowa. A large F4 tornado struck Scott, Oklahoma northeast of Binger. The outbreak injured 12 people, but there were no fatalities.

June
There were 223 tornadoes in the US in June, resulting in eight fatalities.

June 3
A small tornado outbreak affected Colorado, including the Denver metro area.

June 13
An F3 tornado killed four people in Cardington, Ohio.

July
There were 98 tornadoes in the US in July.

July 30
An F3 tornado in North Dakota tracked through Bismarck and Mandan without causing any fatalities or injuries.

August
There were 64 tornadoes in the US in August.

September
There were 26 tornadoes in the US in September.

October
There were 32 tornadoes in the US in October.

November
There were seven tornadoes in the US in November.

November 23 (U.K.)

A large tornado outbreak occurred in central England and Wales. About 104 tornadoes were reported to have touched down in what remains the largest tornado outbreak in European history.

December
There was one tornado in the US in December.

See also
 Tornado
 Tornadoes by year
 Tornado records
 Tornado climatology
 Tornado myths
 List of tornado outbreaks
 List of F5 and EF5 tornadoes
 List of North American tornadoes and tornado outbreaks
 List of 21st-century Canadian tornadoes and tornado outbreaks
 List of European tornadoes and tornado outbreaks
 List of tornadoes and tornado outbreaks in Asia
 List of Southern Hemisphere tornadoes and tornado outbreaks
 List of tornadoes striking downtown areas
 Tornado intensity
 Fujita scale
 Enhanced Fujita scale

References

External links
 Tornado deaths monthly

 
1981 meteorology
Tornado-related lists by year
Torn